Tarvaiidae is a family of nematodes belonging to the order Leptolaimida.

Genera:
 Tarvaia Allgén, 1934

References

Nematodes